Plateumaris is a genus of aquatic leaf beetles in the family Chrysomelidae. There are about 17 described species in Plateumaris.

Species
 Plateumaris aurifera (J. L. LeConte, 1850)
 Plateumaris balli Askevold, 1991
 Plateumaris braccata (Scopoli, 1772)
 Plateumaris consimilis Schrank, 1781
 Plateumaris diversa (Schaeffer, 1925)
 Plateumaris dubia (Schaeffer, 1925) (long-horned leaf beetle)
 Plateumaris flavipes (Kirby, 1837)
 Plateumaris frosti (Schaeffer, 1935)
 Plateumaris fulvipes (Lacordaire, 1845)
 Plateumaris germari (Mannerheim, 1843)
 Plateumaris metallica (Ahrens, 1810)
 Plateumaris neomexicana (Schaeffer, 1925)
 Plateumaris nitida (Germar, 1811)
 Plateumaris notmani (Schaeffer, 1925)
 Plateumaris pusilla (Say, 1826)
 Plateumaris robusta (Schaeffer, 1920)
 Plateumaris rufa (Say, 1826)
 Plateumaris schaefferi Askevold, 1991
 Plateumaris sericea (Linnaeus, 1758)
 Plateumaris shoemakeri (Schaeffer, 1925)

References

Further reading

 
 
 
 

Donaciinae